Continental Center may refer to:

 Continental Center (Columbus, Ohio)
 Continental Center (New York City)

See also
 1600 Smith Street, previously named Continental Center I
 Metropolitan Tower (Chicago), previously named Continental Center I